Suelle Oliveira (born 29 April 1987) is a Brazilian volleyball player and a member of the Brazilian team.

Career 
She was part of the national team at the 2015 FIVB World Grand Prix.

She participated at the 2014 FIVB Volleyball Women's Club World Championship, with her club SESI-SP.

Clubs
  Paraná Vôlei (2002–2004)
  São Caetano (2004–2007)
  Osasco Vôlei (2007–2009)
  AD Brusque (2009–2010)
  Rio de Janeiro (2010–2011)
  Praia Clube (2011–2012)
  SESI São Paulo (2012–2015)
  Molico Osasco (2015–2016)
  Hinode Barueri (2016–2018)
  Victorina Himeji  (2018–2019)
  SESI Bauru (2020–2021)

Awards

Individuals
 2014 FIVB Club World Championship – "Best Outside Spiker"

Clubs
 2007–08 Brazilian Superliga –  Runner-up, with Osasco Vôlei
 2008–09 Brazilian Superliga –  Runner-up, with Osasco Vôlei
 2010–11 Brazilian Superliga –  Champion, with Unilever Vôlei
 2013–14 Brazilian Superliga –  Runner-up, with SESI São Paulo
 2018–19 V.Challenge League –  Champion, with Victorina Himeji
 2009 South American Club Championship –  Champion, with Osasco Vôlei
 2014 South American Club Championship –  Champion, with SESI São Paulo
 2014 FIVB Club World Championship –  Bronze medal, with SESI São Paulo

References

External links 

 FIVB profile
 http://www.melhordovolei.com.br/tag/suelle-oliveira/

1983 births
Living people
Brazilian women's volleyball players
Wing spikers
Sportspeople from Curitiba